Jacob Moon is a solo Canadian folk singer/songwriter and guitarist based in Hamilton, Ontario, Canada.  He has an extensive repertoire of songs, with nine albums to his credit.  He has won many accolades and has been invited to perform for and with some of his heroes, including Rush, Marillion, Ron Sexsmith and Gordon Lightfoot. Moon's famous YouTube cover of Rush's Subdivisions went viral in 2009 and has earned him many fans around the world.

Musical career
Jacob Moon grew up in Kitchener-Waterloo and graduated from Wilfrid Laurier University (WLU) with a B.A. (hon.) in music. In the early years he taught guitar lessons while pursuing his career in music. His touring schedule took off after the 2002 release of independently produced Landing. His concert dates have taken him across Canada and the United States. Although he does sometimes perform with a full band, Moon is known primarily as a solo artist, and his live performances feature extended use of Live looping. Moon has opened for other artists such as Martyn Joseph, David Wilcox, Steve Bell and Jodi King, and he has also toured with the Mike Janzen Trio.  He played as a session guitarist on several Ken Baird's albums. He is also credited with the choir arrangement on Bethany Yarrow's 2003 album Rock Island. Jacob Moon is a member of the Songwriters Unite! songwriters' collective. He has won and been nominated for several prestigious music industry awards as both a performer and as a songwriter.

When Rush was inducted into the Canadian Songwriter's Hall of Fame in 2010, they asked Moon to perform his version of "Subdivisions" at the ceremony, after noticing him through a viral online video of him playing the song. He was asked to sing at the 2010 Rush convention and at the premiere screening of "Beyond the Lighted Stage" at Princess Cinemas in Waterloo on July 2, 2010.

In November 2013, Moon released a new collection of covers entitled 'Fascination' containing works by Rush, Yes, Marillion, Radiohead, Peter Gabriel, Keane, Tom Waits and two original songs never before recorded.  Also in November 2013, he toured Europe opening for Marillion in UK, France, Netherlands and Germany. http://www.marillion.com/tour

Discography

Albums/CDs

Jacob's music is distributed through CDBaby and iTunes, except for his first album which is no longer in print.  His albums since Landing (2002) have Canadian distribution through Signpost Music.

Songs in other projects
 Signpost Collections Vol. 1, "We Will Overcome", (Signpost, 2003)
 December Songs: the Design Hope Songwriters Project, Vol. 2, "Once in Royal David's City", (Design Hope, 2007)
 Sea to Sea: Christmas, "It Came Upon A Midnight Clear" (Lakeside, 2009) Unauthorized pressing (no clearance given by artist)

Collaborations
 co-wrote the lyrics for "I Will Gather You" with Glen Soderholm on his album: World Without End (Signpost, 2006)
 inspired Mike Janzen of The Penny Merchants to release a solo jazz album: Beginnings: Live (Signpost, 2006)
 co-wrote several songs on his albums with Glen Soderholm, including: "Never Give Up On You" and "Magnolia" on Eventide, and "This Christmas" on This Christmas (2007)
 co-wrote "The Kingdom of Heaven" with Jon Buller on his album: Light Up The Sky (Signpost, 2009)

Notable appearances
 harmony vocals on "I Will Gather You" on Glen Soderholm's World Without End (Signpost, 2006)
 vocals on "Mary" and "There's A Star", on Ali Matthews' album Looking for Christmas (Shake a Paw, 2008)
 guitars on Isobelle Gunn's 'Flesh on Steel' CD
 lead vocal and guitar on "Millennium Kids" anthem for G20 conference, June 2010
 Lead Vocal and Guitar on "Something For Nothing", from Rush's 2016 Remaster of their album 2112.

Awards and recognition
GMA Canada Covenant Awards
 2007 nominee, Recorded Song of the Year: "Just Like You"
 2007 nominee, Folk/Roots Song Of The Year: "Just Like You"
 2008 Seasonal Album Of The Year: This Christmas
 2010 for the 2010 Covenant Awards to be announced October 29, 2010 Moon received a nomination for Folk-Roots Song of the Year: "Sara"

Hamilton Music Awards
 2005 nominee, Record of the Year: Eventide
 2005 nominee, Best Male Artist: Eventide
 2005 nominee, Male Vocalist Of The Year: Eventide
 2005 nominee, Guitarist Of The Year
 2005 nominee, Best Folk Recording: Eventide

Shai Awards (formerly The Vibe Awards)
 2004 Folk Album Of The Year: Landing

Toronto Independent Music Awards
 2006 Folk Artist of the Year
 2008 nominee, Best Live-Acoustic Artist

Unisong International Song Contest
 unkn winner, Gospel/Christian Song: "Lights Out"
 2005 honorable mention, Pop Ballad: "Alone In New York"
 2005 second place, Gospel/Christian Song: "Just Like You"
 2006 Song Of The Month, January: "Just Like You"

West Coast Songwriters Song Contest
 2007 Gospel/Inspirational Song: "Just Like You"

Personal life
Jacob was married on December 31, 2005.  He and his wife Allison live in Hamilton, Ontario. They adopted a boy named Gabriel in May 2010, his brother Simon in 2011, and their sister Amelia in 2014.

See also
 Contemporary Christian Music
 Signpost Music

References

External links
 Official Jacob Moon website. Retrieved 2008-09-19.
 Jacob Moon's MySpace. Retrieved 2008-09-19.
 Signpost Music (label). Retrieved 2008-09-19.
 
 
 

Canadian performers of Christian music
Canadian male singer-songwriters
Canadian folk singer-songwriters
Canadian folk guitarists
Canadian male guitarists
Wilfrid Laurier University alumni
Musicians from Hamilton, Ontario
Living people
Year of birth missing (living people)